Southern Cross Hospital North Harbour is the only private surgical in-patient hospital on Auckland's North Shore, New Zealand. It is run by Southern Cross Hospitals Limited, part of the Southern Cross Healthcare Group, and was established in 1991. It is on Wairau Road in the suburb of Glenfield.

The facility undertakes around 6,000 operations annually.

References

External links
Southern Cross Hospital North Harbour (official hospital website)

Hospital buildings completed in 1991
Buildings and structures in Auckland
North Harbour
Hospitals established in 1991
1991 establishments in New Zealand
North Shore, New Zealand